The Wallace House, Wallace Post or Calapooya Fort, was a fur trading station located in the French Prairie in what is now Keizer, Oregon, United States. Founded by personnel of the Pacific Fur Company (PFC) in 1812, it was an important source of beaver pelts and venison for the short lived American enterprise in the Pacific Northwest. Isolated in the War of 1812, the real possibility of the Royal Navy or their North West Company (NWC) competitors attacking Fort Astoria motivated the PFC management to sell its holdings and assets to the NWC in late 1813. Wallace House was utilized by the NWC until 1814, when they abandoned it in favor of the nearby Willamette Trading Post.

Background

Starting with the arrival of the Tonquin and foundation of Fort Astoria in March 1811, the American Pacific Fur Company (PFC) gradually established a commercial presence along the Columbia River. The primary product sought by the company for sale in the Qing Empire were the fur pelts of the North American beaver. After the initial work was finished on Fort Astoria, additional trade posts were ordered to be established throughout the Pacific Northwest. At the time, the Willamette Valley had a sizable population of beaver, making it a suitable location for a secondary station.

Establishment
On November 23, 1812, William Wallace and John C. Halsley led fourteen men from Fort Astoria to the valley to find a suitable area for a trading post. The party wintered there after completed the building, trapping beaver, hunting game and trading with the resident Kalapuyan nations. A fellow band of PFC employees under Donald Mackenzie came from the interior back to Fort Astoria during the winter. The returned trappers proved to be taxing on Astoria's small food supplies so some of the men were ordered to the Wallace House. Alfred Seton led the designated men there, calling the location a "great prairie" with large populations of Elk, Columbian white-tailed deer and Black-tailed deer in nearby areas. Halsley, Wallace and their men returned to Fort Astoria on May 25, 1813 with a sizable supply of venison, a critical food supply that was sorely needed. More commercially important, however, was an inventory of 775 beaver furs captured over the previous winter.

North West Company

The War of 1812 led to the complete isolation of the Pacific Fur Company. Their commercial rivals, the North West Company (NWC), based at their New Caledonian posts such as Fort St. James in the interior of modern British Columbia. To avoid conflict against the Royal Navy, the company officers agreed to sell its assets to the North West Company in 1813.

Throughout 1813 and 1814, trappers who operated out of Wallace House included Thomas McKay, Étienne Lucier, Alexander Ross and Donald McKenzie. A new establishment nearby, the Willamette Trading Post, gradually replaced the Wallace House in importance. Three Americans stationed at the latter location relocated to Wallace House for the majority of January 1814. Despite only having six traps, the men were able to gather 80 beaver skins. The post was abandoned after that season, with no record of it until 1832, when Nathaniel Jarvis Wyeth depicted it on a map of the Willamette Valley. In the early 1840s, the Methodist Mission in Oregon began work on the Oregon Institute in vicinity of where Wallace House was located.

Citations

Bibliography

External links
Wallace House Park from the Keizer Parks Foundation
Wallace House from the City of Keizer

Fur trade
North West Company
Keizer, Oregon